Sergey Vladimirovich Shubenkov (born 4 October 1990) is a Russian athlete who competes in the 110 metres hurdles. He is the 2015 World Champion, two-time European Champion (2014, 2012) and 2013 World bronze medalist in men's 110 m hurdles.

Personal life
Sergey is the son of Natalya Shubenkova, a former Soviet heptathlete who ranks among the best of all time in the event. Shubenkov decided at the age 16 to make sports his profession and began to train intensively. Alongside his athletic pursuits, he is also studying to obtain a degree in law.

Biography
Shubenkov made a breakthrough by finishing 2nd to Britain's Lawrence Clarke at the 2009 European Athletics Junior Championships in Novi Sad, Serbia. Shubenkov went on to win the European under-23 title in 2011. His first Worlds competition was at the 2011 IAAF World Championships in Athletics in Daegu, South Korea where he finished 25th in the heats and did not advance into the semi-finals.

Shubenkov won his first major European title at the 2012 European Championships in 110 m hurdles. Shubenkov debuted in the Olympics at the 2012 Summer Olympics in London. He did not, however, reach the finals in men's 110 m hurdles.

In 2013, Shubenkov took the bronze in 110 hurdles at the 2013 Summer Universiade in Kazan and won the gold medal in 60 m hurdles at the 2013 European Indoor Championships in Gothenburg. He won his first Worlds medal by winning a bronze at the 2013 World Championships in Moscow.

In the 2014 season, Shubenkov competed in the Diamond League series. In 18 May, at the Shanghai Golden Grand Prix, he finished in 4th place – 13.30. In 31 May, taking 5th in the Prefontaine Classic – 13.29. 11 June, took 3rd place in the ExxonMobil Bislett Games – 13.37 and in 3 July, took 2nd place at the Athletissima – 13.13. He repeated as European champion winning gold at the 2014 European Athletics Championships in Zurich.

In 2015 season, Shubenkov won the gold medal at the 2015 World Championships with a Personal Best of 12.98, he edged out Jamaica's Olympic reigning bronze medalist Hansle Parchment and American Olympic defending champion Aries Merritt who won the silver and bronze medals respectively. His personal best in the event is 12.98 seconds, which is the current Russian record. Commenting about winning the competition, the 24-year-old quoted: "I can't describe what I'm feeling, I don't remember anything about the race. I heard the starting gun and then I opened my eyes and it was finished". Shubenkov finished 3rd in the overall ranking in the men's 110 m hurdles of Diamond League series for the 2015 season and won the last leg of the series in Zurich, beating David Oliver and Orlando Ortega.

In 2021, Shubenkov qualified for the 2020 Summer Olympics held in Tokyo, Japan from July-August 2021. During the warm-ups Shubenkov ruptured an Achilles tendon, forcing him to withdraw from the 110m hurdles event.

Competition record

References

External links

1990 births
Living people
Sportspeople from Barnaul
Russian male hurdlers
Olympic male hurdlers
Olympic athletes of Russia
Athletes (track and field) at the 2012 Summer Olympics
European Championships (multi-sport event) silver medalists
Universiade medalists in athletics (track and field)
Universiade bronze medalists for Russia
Medalists at the 2013 Summer Universiade
World Athletics Championships athletes for Russia
Authorised Neutral Athletes at the World Athletics Championships
World Athletics Championships winners
World Athletics Championships medalists
IAAF Continental Cup winners
European Athletics Championships winners
European Athletics Championships medalists
European Athletics Indoor Championships winners
Russian Athletics Championships winners
Diamond League winners